The 2014–15 Rugby-Bundesliga was the 44th edition of this competition and the 95th edition of the German rugby union championship. In the Rugby-Bundesliga, twenty-one teams played in, initially, four regional divisions, the first stage of the competition, followed by a championship round of sixteen clubs and, finally, the play-offs consisting of twelve teams. The season started on 30 August 2014 and finished with the championship final on 16 May 2015 in Heidelberg, interrupted by a winter break from December to late February. Nominally the league should consist of twenty-four teams however only twenty-one fulfilled the licensing requirements for 2014–15.

The defending champions were Heidelberger RK who defeated TV Pforzheim in the 2014 final to take out its tenth championship and fifth in a row. Heidelberger RK remained unbeaten throughout the 2013–14 regular season, as it had been all throughout the 2012–13 Rugby-Bundesliga season, having last lost in the Bundesliga on 1 November 2011, when HRK was beaten 26–24 by TV Pforzheim. Heidelberg took out its sixth consecutive title and twelfth overall when it defeated Pforzheim 53–27 in the final once more, capping another season without defeat. The club thereby also equaled a championship record, becoming the second club after Victoria Linden to win six consecutive titles.

It was to be the last edition with twenty four clubs as the annual general meeting of the DRV in July 2015 decided to reduce the league to sixteen clubs from the 2015–16 season onwards.

Overview

The league saw only minor changes compare to the previous season, having played at full strength of 24 clubs in 2013–14 instead of only 21 in 2014–15. The 08 Ricklingen/Wunstorf withdrew from the league during the 2013–14 season, while TuS 95 Düsseldorf, RC Mainz, Veltener RC and USV Potsdam Rugby were relegated from the competition. New in the league were RU Hohen Neuendorf and SG Siemensstadt/Grizzlies.

The first stage of the competition, the Vorrunde, nominally saw four six-team groupes in which each team played the other five just once, however the western group played with only four temas and the northern group with only five. This stage finished in late September after which the second stage started, the Qualifikationsphase, in which the top teams each from the southern and the western group play each other in one group while the top teams from the north and east play each other in another. The fourth placed team from each division would play the fifth placed in the opposite group to determine the last two places in the second round. The five teams not qualified for the Qualifikationsphase entered the DRV-Pokal, the German rugby union cup, together with the top eight teams of the 2. Bundesliga. The 2. Bundesliga teams not qualified for the DRV-Pokal in turn played for the Liga Pokal.

In the second stage the teams within a group would play each other in a home-and-away format, with the teams that already played each other in the first stage carrying over those results. Of the sixteen clubs the best six in each group now qualified for the knock-out stage. The knock-out stage was played in a single-game format with the higher seeded team enjoying home advantage and the winner advancing to the next round.

Bundesliga tables & results

First stage
In the first stage twenty-one clubs played in four groups. Within each group each team played the other just once. The best three teams advanced directly to the second stage while the teams placed fourth and fifth had to play a qualifying decider.

North
The division table: 

 Relegated: TSV Victoria Linden
 Promoted: none

East
The division table:

 Relegated: SG Siemensstadt/Grizzlies, Berliner SV 92 Rugby
 Promoted: none

West
The division table:

 Relegated: RC Aachen
 Promoted: none

South
The division table:

 Relegated: Heidelberger TV
 Promoted: none
 SG Siemensstadt/Grizzlies and Heidelberger TV deducted four points, TV Pforzheim deducted two points for lack of mandatory youth program.

Qualifying matches
Three qualifying matches were held to determine the last three clubs to enter the second stage. Nominally the fourth placed club in the southern division played the fifth placed team in the western division and the fourth placed western club the fifth placed southern team. However, as the western division had only four clubs the fourth placed team in the south received a bye and direct entry into the championship round. The same system applied to the northern and eastern division where the league strength required both games to take place. The winners of the three games advanced to the second stage while the losers had to enter the DRV-Pokal.

North-East

South-West

Second stage
In the second stage sixteen clubs played in two groups of eight clubs each. Within each group each team played the others home and away except for the match-ups that already had been played in the first round. The results of those were carried over. The best six teams in each group qualified for the play-offs and were seeded according to the final standings. The second round concluded on 18 April 2015 and was followed by the play-offs.

North-East
The division table:

 SG Siemensstadt/Grizzlies failed to field in two consecutive games and was removed from the competition in April 2015.

South-West
The division table:

 TV Pforzheim deducted two points.

Play-off stage
In the play-offs the twelve qualified teams played four rounds. The best two clubs in each division received a bye for the first round and entered in the quarter finals stage. The first round was played on 25 April, the quarter finals were held on 2 May and the semi finals on 9 May. The final of the German championship was held on 16 May:

DRV-Pokal tables & results
The five worst clubs in the first stage of the Bundesliga entered the DRV-Pokal for 2014–15, together with the eight best clubs from the 2nd Rugby-Bundesliga. The DRV-Pokal ranks as a second tier to the German championship but also functioned as a qualifying competition for the 2015–16 Rugby-Bundesliga. The modus for the DRV-Pokal was the same as for the German championship, with a second stage with two divisions of, nominally, eight teams, followed by the play-offs made up of the best twelve teams, with the top two in each division receiving a bye for the first round.

Group stage

North-East
The division table:

 Berliner Rugby Club II two points deducted.

South-West
The division table:

 ‡ Denotes 2014–15 Bundesliga club.
 Heidelberger TV and TGS Hausen deducted four points.

Play-off stage
The 2014–15 final was played on 23 May 2014 in Heidelberg. The play-offs for the DRV-Pokal started on 25 April 2015:

 Veltener RC did not field against RC Luxembourg, game awarded to Luxembourg.

References

External links 
 rugbyweb.de - Rugby-Bundesliga table & results 
 Totalrugby.de - Bundesliga table & results 
 Rugby-Bundesliga at scoresway.com

2014–15
2014–15 in German rugby union
Germany